The Speaker's Lectures were series of lectures initiated by John Bercow, the Speaker of the House of Commons, from 2011 to 2019. To mark the centenary of the Parliament Act 1911, Bercow commissioned a series of 11 lectures throughout 2011 covering some of the main political figures of the century. Each lecture was given to an invited audience in Speaker's House and was recorded for broadcast on BBC Parliament. In 2012 Bercow instituted a new 11 lecture series on the subject of the 'Great Offices of State' (those of Chancellor of the Exchequer, Home Secretary and Foreign Secretary). In 2013 the lectures were on the subject of 'Parliaments and Parliamentarians', given by leading Parliamentarians who have experience of other legislatures. The 2014 series concentrated on 'Parliamentarians on Public Policy'. In 2015 and 2016, Bercow instituted the theme of 'Parliamentarians on Parliamentarians', based on prominent Parliamentarians throughout history. The 2017 series focused on 'The Future of...' various political topics, such as the Press, Armed Forces, or Brexit. The penultimate 2018 series was divided into two parts, with the first being 'Brexit and beyond, Britain's place in the world in the 2020s', and the second 'Women and British Politics, where next?'. The 2019 series carried the theme 'What if?', discussing hypothetical political scenarios from recent history. This series was cut short as Bercow's status and role in Brexit became elevated. There is no plan for the series to continue under the following Speaker, Lindsay Hoyle.

'1911 Centenary' lectures 
The first series of lectures, starting in 2011, covered the careers of some of the great parliamentarians of the past 100 years. The subjects were:

 David Lloyd George by Lord Morgan, 11 January
 F. E. Smith by Sir Peter Tapsell MP, 1 February
 Nancy Astor by Shirley Williams, 29 March
 Sir Winston Churchill by Nicholas Soames MP, 26 April
 Aneurin Bevan by Gordon Marsden MP, 17 May
 Enoch Powell by Lord Norton of Louth, 14 June
 Michael Foot by Lord Kinnock, 12 July
 Iain Macleod by Lord Hurd, 6 September
 Roy Jenkins by Lord Adonis, 25 October
 Margaret Thatcher by John Whittingdale MP, 15 November
 Tony Benn by Tristram Hunt MP, 6 December

'Great Offices of State' lectures 
The 2012 lectures surrounded the great offices of state. In introducing the first lecture, Bercow noted that his assistant had spotted that there were 11 sitting Members who had served in one or more of these offices but had not been Prime Minister, and that all had accepted his invitation to give a lecture. The lecturers were:

 Kenneth Clarke (Home Secretary 1992–93, Chancellor of the Exchequer 1993–97), 24 January
 Alistair Darling (Chancellor of the Exchequer 2007–10), 20 February
 Theresa May (Home Secretary 2010-16), 26 March
 Malcolm Rifkind (Foreign Secretary 1995–97), 23 April
 David Blunkett (Home Secretary 2001–04), 15 May
 David Miliband (Foreign Secretary 2007–10), 19 June
 Jack Straw (Home Secretary 1997–2001, Foreign Secretary 2001–06), 15 July
 Margaret Beckett (Foreign Secretary 2006–07), 11 September
 George Osborne (Chancellor of the Exchequer 2010-16), 22 October
 Alan Johnson (Home Secretary 2009–10), 5 November
 William Hague (Foreign Secretary 2010-14), 18 December

'Parliaments and Parliamentarians' lectures
The 2013 lectures were given by leading Parliamentarians who have experience of other legislatures. The lecturers were:

 Lord Alderdice (Speaker of the Northern Ireland Assembly 1998-2004), 29 January
 Keith Vaz MP on the Parliament of India, February
 Lord Steel (Presiding Officer of the Scottish Parliament 1999-2003), 18 March
 Lord Davies of Stamford on the National Assembly of France, April
 Lord Boateng on the Parliament of South Africa, Parliament of Ghana and the Parliament of Somaliland, 20 May
 Lord Elis-Thomas (Presiding Officer of the National Assembly for Wales 1999–2011), 11 June
 Gisela Stuart MP on the German Bundestag, 2 July
 Baroness Liddell of Coatdyke on the Parliament of Australia, 28 October
 Baroness Nicholson of Winterbourne on the European Parliament, 10 December
 Baroness Williams of Crosby on the United States Congress, 18 December

'Parliamentarians on Public Policy' lectures
The 2014 series of lectures was given by Members of Parliament and Members of the House of Lords with a particular expertise or interest in specific areas of public policy. The lectures and subjects are:

 Lord Norton of Louth on Parliament and Political Parties, 21 January
 Dame Tessa Jowell on Parliament and the Press, 25 February
 John Redwood on Parliament and Economic Policy, 18 March
 Frank Field on Parliament and Social Policy, 8 April
 Sir Malcolm Rifkind on Parliament and Foreign Policy and War, May
 Tristram Hunt on Parliament and the Crown, June
 Lord Heseltine on Parliament and Industrial Policy, 18 June
 Harriet Harman on Parliament and Equality, 8 July
 Sir Menzies Campbell on Parliament and Justice, September
 David Davis on Parliament and Liberty, 22 October
 Lord Hennessy on Parliament and the State, 18 November
 Sir Tony Baldry on Parliament and the Church, 16 December

'Parliamentarians on Parliamentarians' lectures (2015)
The 2015 series covered famous Parliamentarians from history. The subjects were:

 William Hague on William Pitt the Younger, 13 January
 Lord Hurd of Westwell on Benjamin Disraeli, 24 March
 Lord Bew on Charles Stewart Parnell, 19 May
 Kwasi Kwarteng on Lord Palmerston, 9 June
 Lord Lexden on the Earl of Shaftesbury, 30 June
 Lord Williams of Elvel on Harold Macmillan, 14 July
 Sir Bill Cash on John Bright, 15 September
 Jesse Norman on Edmund Burke, 27 October
 Lord Norton of Louth on Eleanor Rathbone, 3 November
 Lord Cormack on William Wilberforce, 10 November
 Tristram Hunt on John Pym, 8 December

'Parliamentarians on Parliamentarians' lectures (2016)
The 2016 series covered noted Parliamentarians from recent history. The lecturers were:

 Professor the Lord Morgan on James Callaghan, 19 January
 Lord Steel of Aikwood on Jo Grimond, 8 February
 Tristram Hunt on Harold Wilson, 7 March
 Lord Radice on Hugh Gaitskell, 18 April
 Lord Lexden on Anthony Eden, 10 May
 Nick Thomas-Symonds on Michael Foot, 11 July
 Rt Hon Dame Margaret Beckett on John Smith, 7 November
 Rt Hon Lord Patten on Edward Heath, 8 November
 Rt Hon Baroness Williams of Crosby on Charles Kennedy, 29 November
 Gordon Marsden on Clement Attlee, 12 December

'The Future of...' lectures

The 2017 lecture covered the future of various issues, institutions, and causes. In this series Bercow also introduced a respondent, often a speaker external to Parliament.

 Rt Hon Dr Julian Lewis, responded to by Deborah Haynes, on "The Future of the Armed Forces", 16 January
 Rt Hon Hilary Benn, responded to by Rt Hon Michael Gove, on "The Future of Brexit", 21 February
 James Purnell, responded to by Rt Hon Maria Miller, on "The Future of Broadcasting", 1 March
 Rt Hon Lord Willetts, responded to by Maddalaine Ansell, on "The Future of Higher Education", 29 March
 Dr Sarah Wollaston, responded to by Professor Chris Ham, on "The Future of the NHS", 11 July
 Rt Hon Lord Maude of Horsham, responded to by Bronwen Maddox, on "The Future of the Civil Service", 12 September
 Rt Hon John Whittingdale, responded to by Jim Waterson, on "The Future of the Press", 17 October
 Rt Hon Caroline Flint, responded to by Drew Hendry, on "The Future of Energy", 14 November
 Rt Hon Norman Lamb, responded to by Caroline Abrahams, on "The Future of Social Care", 27 November
 Damian Collins, responded to by Frances Morris, on "The Future of Museums, Libraries and Galleries", 5 December

'Brexit and beyond, Britain's place in the world in the 2020s' lectures 
The first half of the 2018 lectures concerned Brexit and the status of Britain after departure from the European Union.
 Rt Hon Kenneth Clarke, 29 January
 Rt Hon John Redwood, 20 February
 Tony Blair, 26 March
 Rt Hon Liam Fox, 30 April
 Nick Clegg, 21 May
 Rt Hon Jacob Rees-Mogg, 18 June

'Women and British Politics, where next?' lectures 
The second half of the 2018 lectures tackled women's role in British politics.
 Rt Hon Stella Creasy, 17 July
 Rt Hon Harriet Harman, 22 October
 Rt Hon Anna Soubry, 19 November
 Rt Hon Joanna Cherry, 21 January 2019 (rescheduled)

'What if?' lectures 
In 2019, the lecture theme instituted returned to the historical nature of previous series, yet with a hypothetical twist. As the Brexit Withdrawal Agreement went through Parliament, John Bercow gained a higher profile. Due to this and the 2019 general election, the lectures were cut short.
 Lord Adonis on "What if Harold Wilson had fallen and Roy Jenkins became Prime Minister in 1968?", 25 February
 Lord Norton of Louth on "What if Ted Heath had resigned in October 1974 and Willie Whitelaw had become Tory Leader?", 18 March
 Rt Hon Gordon Marsen on "What if Dennis Healey had beaten Michael Foot and become Labour leader in 1981?", 29 April

References 

Speaker's Lectures
Parliament of the United Kingdom-related lists